Alexsandro Oliveira Duarte (born 10 January 1981 in Janduís), or simply Sandro, is a Brazilian footballer who plays as a left-sided attacking midfielder. He currently plays for Associação Atlética Anapolina.

Honours
Minas Gerais State League: 2003, 2004, 2006
Brazilian League: 2003
Brazilian Cup: 2003

Contract
1 January 2007 to 31 December 2008

External links
sportsya 
CBF 

Guardian Stats Centre

1981 births
Living people
Brazilian footballers
ABC Futebol Clube players
Criciúma Esporte Clube players
Cruzeiro Esporte Clube players
Guaratinguetá Futebol players
Associação Atlética Anapolina players
Xuan Thanh Saigon Cement FC players
Association football midfielders